Echinocereus subinermis is a species of flowering plant in the cactus family Cactaceae, native to north, northwestern, and central Mexico.

In cultivation in temperate regions it requires the protection of glass with heat. It has gained the Royal Horticultural Society's Award of Garden Merit.

References 

subinermis